Paray-sous-Briailles is a commune with 693 residents (as of January 1, 2017) in the French department of Allier in the Auvergne-Rhône-Alpes region; before 2016, it belonged to the Auvergne region. Paray-sous-Briailles is located in the arrondissement (eng. administrative region) of Moulins and the canton of Saint-Pourçain-sur-Sioule. Its residents are called Parodiens.

Geography 
Paray-sous-Briailles lies about 35 kilometers south-southeast of Moulins and 23 kilometers north-northwest of Vichy on the Allier river, which borders the municipality from the east. Paray-sous-Briailles is bordered by the municipalities of Saint-Pourçain-sur-Sioule to the north and west, Varennes-sur-Allier to the north and east, Créchy to the southeast, Marcenat to the south, as well as Loriges to the south and southwest.

Population

See also
Communes of the Allier department

Places of interest 

 Church of Saint-Julien from the 12th century
 Castle
 Tower of Villemouze

Literature 
Le Patrimoine des Communes de l'Allier. Volume 2. Flohic Editions, Paris 1999, p. 958-959.

References

Communes of Allier
Allier communes articles needing translation from French Wikipedia